Altrincham and Sale was a parliamentary constituency in Greater Manchester, represented in the House of Commons of the Parliament of the United Kingdom.  It elected one Member of Parliament (MP) by the first past the post system of election, and existed between 1945 and 1997.

History and boundaries
The House of Commons (Redistribution of Seats) Act 1944 set up Boundary Commissions to carry out periodic reviews of the distribution of parliamentary constituencies. It also authorised an initial review to subdivide abnormally large constituencies (those exceeding an electorate of 100,000) in time for the 1945 election. This was implemented by the Redistribution of Seats Order 1945 under which Cheshire was allocated one additional seat, by splitting the constituency of Altrincham into two seats:

 Altrincham and Sale, comprising the two respective municipal boroughs; and
 Bucklow, comprising the bulk of the remainder of the constituency

The constituency remained unchanged until 1 April 1974 when, under the terms of the Local Government Act 1972, the boroughs of Altrincham and Sale were absorbed into the new metropolitan borough of Trafford within the county of Greater Manchester. However, the boundaries were not revised until the Third Periodic Review of Westminster constituencies came into effect for the 1983 general election. The revised constituency consisted of the south-eastern area of Trafford, with the main town being Altrincham, and comprised:

The Metropolitan Borough of Trafford wards of Altrincham, Bowdon, Broadheath, Brooklands, Hale, Sale Moor, Timperley, and Village.

Hale and Bowdon were transferred from the abolished Cheshire constituency of Knutsford, while parts of the former municipal borough of Sale, including Ashton upon Mersey, were included in the new constituency of Davyhulme.

The constituency was abolished for the 1997 general election, when it was split in a roughly three to one ratio between the new constituencies of Altrincham and Sale West and Wythenshawe and Sale East.

Political history 
The constituency always elected a Conservative member with a comfortable majority and only had three MPs during its 52 years in existence. From 1945, it was represented by Frederick Erroll, a cabinet minister in Harold Macmillan's government, who was raised to the peerage in 1964. The ensuing by-election (held in 1965) was won by Anthony Barber, who served as Edward Heath's Chancellor of the Exchequer. Barber also entered the House of Lords, and at the October 1974 general election was succeeded by Fergus Montgomery, later Sir Fergus Montgomery, who served as Parliamentary Private Secretary to Margaret Thatcher, during her tenure as Secretary of State for Education, and then as Leader of the Opposition. Montgomery held the seat until he retired in 1997.

Members of Parliament

Elections

Election in the 1940s

Elections in the 1950s

Elections in the 1960s

Elections in the 1970s

Elections in the 1980s

Elections in the 1990s

See also
List of parliamentary constituencies in Greater Manchester
History of parliamentary constituencies and boundaries in Cheshire

Notes and references

Parliamentary constituencies in North West England (historic)
Constituencies of the Parliament of the United Kingdom established in 1945
Constituencies of the Parliament of the United Kingdom disestablished in 1997
Politics of Trafford